The Sisters of the Precious Blood  is a Roman Catholic female religious order founded in 1845 in Steinerberg, Switzerland by Magdalene Weber and a number of young women from Baden.

History
Young women from Baden, Germany joined together for the perpetual adoration of the Most Precious Blood in the Blessed Sacrament, under the guidance of Reverend Karl Rolfus. The group began as a contemplative community. One of their number made a pilgrimage to the Marian shrine in Einsiedeln, Switzerland and to the nearby St. Anne shrine in Steinerberg. As at that time, German religious communities were not allowed to accept new members, Magdalene Weber led twelve of them to Switzerland. The Sisters of the Most Precious Blood was founded in Steinerberg, Switzerland on September 8, 1845, as a contemplative community. However, as Swiss law prohibited all strictly contemplative orders, they developed an apostolic character, as well. In the spring of 1848, the community re-located to Ottmarsheim, France, in the French Alsace, where, as they were German, they were precluded from teaching and so became contemplative once more.

In 1857 Rev. Herman Kessler, pastor of Gurtweil, Baden, who had long desired to establish a home for destitute children and a normal school for the training of religious teachers, asked for six members of the community of the Sisters of the Precious Blood from Ottmarsheim, Alsace. They responded and began their work with twelve poor children under the direction of Father Kessler. Under the auspices of Archbishop von Vicari of Freiburg, a novitiate and normal school were established; the latter was affiliated with the educational department of Karlsruhe. Other schools and academies were opened. At Gurtweil, the Sisters taught students to make Church vestments, the beginning of their Ecclesiastical Art ministry. In 1860, the congregation split, the contemplative sisters in Ottmarsheim, and the more apostolic in Gurtweil.

With anti-Catholic sentiment growing in Germany, American bishops offered the opportunity to minister to newly arrived German immigrants. In 1868 Bishop Junker of Alton, Illinois, asked for sisters for his diocese. In 1870 a number of sisters sailed for Belle Prairie (named Piopolis in 1877) in the Diocese of Alton, arriving on March 2. Meantime Bishop Baltes succeeded Bishop Junker; he entrusted to them several parochial school and promised further assistance on condition that the community should establish itself permanently in his diocese subject to his authority. The Superior of the community returned to Germany to present the matter to the Motherhouse.

In September 1871, Mother Augusta Volk, superior of the mother-house at Gurtweil, and twelve more sisters arrived in Springfield. Mother Augusta was apprehensive of a premature separation from Gurtweil, and was also opposed to limiting the sisters' activity to one diocese only. She went to St. Louis where through the efforts of Father Muehlsiepen, Vicar- General of St. Louis, the Sisters of the Precious Blood were received into the Archdiocese of St. Louis (1872) and obtained charge of a number of schools in Missouri and Nebraska.

Sisters of the Most Precious Blood (CPPS)
In the autumn of 1872, another fourteen sisters from Gurtweil arrived at the novitiate established in Belle Prairie. To make room for them, twenty sisters relocated to St. Louis, where the Rev. F. Leygraff, pastor of St. Agatha's had provided a home for the sisters until a motherhouse could be built. 

In 1873 the Kulturkampf had reached its climax and the entire community was expelled from Germany; some went to Rome, others settled in Bosnia, Hungary. In September, Fr. Muehlsiepen met forty-nine sisters in New York and conducted them to St. Louis, where the new Motherhouse in O'Fallon, Missouri was completed by July, 1875.  

The O'Fallon community re-organized with a new rule and constitution and was incorporated in 1878 under the laws of the State of Missouri with the legal title of St. Mary's Institute of O'Fallon, Missouri. Mother Augusta Volk is considered the foundress of the congregation. A new novitiate was begun in O'Fallon. The O'Fallon Sisters became a congregation of pontifical right in 1918 and uses the post-nominals CPPS. As of 2019, there were about 100 sisters in the O'Fallon congregation.

Adorers of the Blood of Christ (ASC)
With the establishment of the motherhouse in O'Fallon, the congregation split once again. Mother Clementine Zerr, with ten professed sisters a number of novices at Belle Prairie chose to maintain affiliation with the Precious Blood Congregation in Rome. They relocated to Ruma, Illinois, where they established the first U.S. motherhouse for the Adorers of the Blood of Christ. A second province was established in Wichita, Kansas in 1929; and a third, by Bosnian sisters, in Columbia, Pennsylvania. In 2000, they united to form the United States Region of the Adorers of the Blood of Christ.

References

External links
 Congregation website

Catholic Church in Germany
Catholic female orders and societies
1857 establishments in Germany